The Custos Rotulorum of County Kilkenny was the highest civil officer in County Kilkenny.

Incumbents

1758–59 William Ponsonby, 2nd Earl of Bessborough
?–1820 Walter Butler, 1st Marquess of Ormonde

For later custodes rotulorum, see Lord Lieutenant of Kilkenny

References

Kilkenny